Rajeev Kumar Singh (25 December 1952 – 31 January 2022) was an Indian politician. He represented the Dariyabad in Barabanki district of Uttar Pradesh. He has been Agriculture minister of Uttar Pradesh and 6 times MLA.

His self reported profile on UP Assembly website, mentioned that he was born on 25 December 1952 in Lucknow, in Thakur caste. He had studied till high school. He married on 6 February 1975 and had a son and a daughter. He had listed farming as his occupation. He died on 31 January 2022.

Political career
In 2012, Rajeev Kumar Singh contested Uttar Pradesh Assembly Election as Samajwadi Party candidate and won, becoming a member of the 16th Uttar Pradesh Assembly. 

In 2017, Bharatiya Janta Party candidate Satish Chandra Sharma won the 2017 Uttar Pradesh Legislative Elections defeating Samajwadi Party candidate Rajeev Kumar Singh by a margin of 50,686 votes.

References

External links
Biography on UP Assembly website

1952 births
2022 deaths 
Samajwadi Party politicians from Uttar Pradesh
People from Barabanki district
Uttar Pradesh MLAs 1985–1989
Uttar Pradesh MLAs 1989–1991
Uttar Pradesh MLAs 1997–2002
Uttar Pradesh MLAs 2002–2007
Uttar Pradesh MLAs 2007–2012
Uttar Pradesh MLAs 2012–2017
Former members of Bharatiya Janata Party from Uttar Pradesh